Nancledra or Nancledrea is a village in west Cornwall, England, UK.  It is three miles (5 km) south of St Ives and four miles (6.5 km) north-northeast of Penzance. Nancledra is a small village with a population of around 150. The village is in Towednack civil parish in the former mining area of Penwith peninsula.

A pub, The Engine Inn, is situated at Cripplesease just outside the village, but Nancledra has no village shop or Post Office.

The name of the village probably means valley of Clodri or valley of Cludri.

Robert Morton Nance, one of the chief revivers of the Cornish language, lived in Nancledra.

The local community radio station is Coast FM (formerly Penwith Radio), which broadcasts on 96.5 and 97.2 FM.

References

External links

Penwith
Villages in Cornwall